Hendricus Theodorus Christiaan "Henk" Stoof (born 1962) is a professor in theoretical physics at Utrecht University in the Netherlands.  His main interests are atomic physics, condensed matter physics and many-body physics. He is a Fellow of the American Physical Society.

During the last ten years, the group of H.T.C. Stoof has been involved in the study of various aspects of the physics of ultracold atomic gases. In addition, they performed research on skyrmion lattices in the quantum Hall effect and collective modes in supersolid 4He. Below the results obtained from the study of degenerate Fermi gases are briefly summarized.

Already in 1996 they predicted that an atomic gas of 6Li (a fermionic isotope of lithium) becomes a Bardeen-Cooper-Schrieffer (BCS) superfluid at experimentally obtainable temperatures. They have also performed a detailed study of the superfluid behaviour of this gas below the critical temperature. Motivated by this work, at least six experimental groups from around the world, including the groups of R. Grimm, R.G. Hulet, D.S. Jin, and W. Ketterle, started trying to achieve the necessary conditions for the BCS transition in 6Li.
In the last seven years the study of superfluidity in Fermi gases has been at the center of attention of the ultracold atoms community. It is fair to say that the very successful experiments, that ultimately have led to the creation of the superconductor with, as a fraction of the Fermi energy, the highest critical temperature ever, have only been possible due to the use of so-called Feshbach resonances. These resonances were theoretically co-discovered by H.T.C. Stoof in the alkalis in 1993.
At that time, the full potential of a Feshbach resonance for studying the crossover from a BCS superconductor of Bose-Einstein condensed Cooper pairs to a Bose-Einstein condensate (BEC) of molecules was not realized yet, but this crossover is now well understood due to the strong connection between experiment and ab initio theory that is possible in this field. The group has made important contributions to the present understanding of how many-body physics affects the BEC-BCS crossover, and how to incorporate the two-body physics of the Feshbach resonance exactly into the many-body theory. Henk Stoof was elected as an APS Fellow for these contributions.

In the last three years, the group of R.G. Hulet at Rice and the group of W. Ketterle at MIT have pioneered the experimental study of spin imbalance on the superfluid state. These experiments have especially concentrated on the strongly interacting or unitarity limit exactly at resonance where the attraction between the atoms is as large as quantum mechanics allows. Again, the group of H.T.C. Stoof made important contributions to this topic. For example, they were first to predict the topology of the universal phase diagram of this unitarity gas, that is now confirmed by the experiments and that contains a tricritical temperature below which the gas phase separates between an (almost) equal density superfluid and a polarized normal gas. Making use of renormalization group techniques, they are up to now the only theoretical group that has been able to accurately calculate this strong-coupling tricritical temperature from first principles. They believe that an important reason for the success in this area of physics is that they have a background in both the microscopic atomic physics and in the macroscopic condensed-matter physics. It is only through a combination of this knowledge that one can arrive at sophisticated many-body theories that can be directly compared with experiment without any fitting parameters.

External links
 Homepage H.T.C. Stoof

1962 births
Living people
21st-century Dutch physicists
Academic staff of Utrecht University
Eindhoven University of Technology alumni
People from Veldhoven